The Type 22 (NATO designation: Houbei class) missile boat is a ship class in the Chinese People's Liberation Army Navy. The first boat was launched in April 2004 by the Hudong-Zhonghua Shipyard at Shanghai. The boats incorporate stealth features and are based on Australian-designed wave-piercing catamaran hulls that are more stable than other fast missile craft in high sea conditions. 82 of these missile boats are currently in service with three flotillas having been produced over a span of seven years, operating in squadrons of eight vessels each.

Design
The Type 22 fast attack craft are China's entry into a growing list of missile-armed attack craft which include Finland's Hamina class missile boat, and Norway's Skjold class patrol boat. The Australian AMD catamaran design may mean as much as a 50% reduction in vessel speed penalty in high sea conditions (in which monohulls may only perform at half or less of their maximum capability). Further, seasickness and disorientation is significantly reduced, improving the combat readiness/situational awareness of the small-craft operators during such conditions.

The polygonal-designed superstructure with its similarly angled gun mount indicates a reduced radar cross-section, although probably not enough to be a full stealth-ship as it is built from aluminium rather than composites, and also has a lot of reflective "clutter" in form of rails, searchlights and launchers on the deck; the ships have been shown to be visible using synthetic aperture radar from satellites. The Type 22 has an advanced C4 datalink that may represent some kind of capability to allow AWACS planes or other ships to vector the Type 22's missiles. The aluminium hull is reported to use friction stir welding.

Capabilities

The Type 22 is designed to patrol China's coastal areas and operate within its littoral zone.  As each of the 83 ships is armed with eight anti-ship missiles, it is speculated by some observers that a large number of missile craft firing in salvos can potentially overwhelm an enemy fleet, including an aircraft carrier battle group. Although an offensive missile attack poses a threat to hostile surface ships, historically small missile boats have fared poorly in major naval confrontations against larger vessels and aircraft, so the Type 22 is vulnerable when operating outside of air defense cover.

See also
Kuang Hua VI-class missile boat
Skjold class patrol boat
Hamina class missile boat
Roussen Class fast attack craft
Type 021 class missile boat

References
Notes

Sources
 Watts, Anthony J. Jane's Warship Recognition Guide.

External links
Houbei Class (Type 022) Fast Attack Craft
IDEX 2007 Showcases China’s Productive Weapons Sector
武汉华之洋光电系统有限责任公司/Wuhan Naval Electro-Optics Company
AMD Marine Consulting AMD350PB Design

Missile boats of the People's Liberation Army Navy
Missile boat classes
Catamarans
Military catamarans